Old Alresford (  or  ) is a village and civil parish in Hampshire, England.

In 1851, George Sumner, son of Charles Richard Sumner (Bishop of Winchester), became rector of the parish. There his wife, Mary Sumner, started the Mothers' Union, now a global organisation of Anglican women. The first meetings were held in the rectory, now a conference centre known as Old Alresford Place.

In 1986, following the closure of the village school and post office, The Old Alresford Dramatic Society (T.O.A.D.S.) was founded as a way of bringing the village together. They perform a pantomime in December each year and a Spring Show, usually in May.

St Mary the Virgin parish church is a brick building dating from the 1750s. The naval hero George Brydges Rodney, 1st Baron Rodney, is buried in the church. His family seat, Old Alresford House, is next to the church. Also in the churchyard is the mausoleum of C. F. G. R. Schwerdt, an art collector, who died in 1939.

Gallery

References

External links
 

Villages in Hampshire
City of Winchester